Sebastian Murphy (born 1990 in Ballarat, Victoria) is an apprentice Thoroughbred horse racing jockey.

He is the son of Champion Australian jockey Garry Murphy and is currently working under Ballarat trainer Darren Weir.

Murphy rode in the 2007 Melbourne Cup aboard the Michael Moroney trained horse, Sarrera.

Murphy is currently ranked fourth overall in Australia for 2008 and is the leading Australian Apprentice.

Sebastian Murphy won his first Group 1 race on Saturday 7 June when he rode the Mike Moroney trained Mr Baritone to victory in the Stradbroke Handicap at Eagle Farm.

References

External links 
http://rvl.bestbets.com.au/rvl/racing.jockey.view.cmd?JOCKEY_ID=16007
http://www.theage.com.au/news/horse-racing/murphy-races-to-a-special-victory/2006/12/16/1166162372211.html
http://www.news.com.au/heraldsun/story/0,21985,23832406-11088,00.html

1990 births
Living people
Australian jockeys
21st-century Australian people